Ford jeep may refer to:

 Ford GPW, the World War II U.S. four-wheel drive military utility vehicle, manufactured by Ford, using the "Willys" licensed design, from 1941 to 1945
 Ford Pygmy, Ford's first prototype for the U.S. Army's requirement for the World War II light reconnaissance vehicle
 Ford M151, Ford's successor to the U.S. military Willys jeeps, produced from 1959, and used through the 1990s
 Ford Bronco, Ford's SUV line, launched to compete with the Jeep CJ; produced from 1966 to 1996, over five generations